The year 1992 was the 21st year after the independence of Bangladesh. It was the second year of the first term of the government of Khaleda Zia.

Incumbents

 President: Abdur Rahman Biswas
 Prime Minister: Khaleda Zia
 Chief Justice: Shahabuddin Ahmed

Demography

Climate

Cyclone

A powerful tropical cyclone, named Cyclone Forrest prompted the evacuation of 600,000 people in Bangladesh in late November 1992. Originating from an area of disturbed weather near the Caroline Islands on 9 November, Forrest was classified as a tropical depression three days later over the South China Sea. Tracking generally west, the system steadily organized into a tropical storm, passing Vietnam to the south, before striking Thailand along the Malay Peninsula on 15 November. Once over the Bay of Bengal, Forrest turned northward on 17 November and significantly intensified. It reached its peak intensity on 20 November as a Category 4-equivalent cyclone on the Saffir–Simpson hurricane scale with winds of 230 km/h (145 mph). Hostile environmental conditions soon affected the cyclone as it turned abruptly east-northeastward. Forrest made landfall in northwestern Myanmar as a weakening system on 21 November before dissipating early the next day.

On 20 November, as Forrest reached its peak intensity, fears arose across Bangladesh that a repeat of the catastrophic April 1991 cyclone would take place. As a result, mass evacuation plans were enacted across coastal areas of the country, with plans to relocate up to 2 million people. But the storm abruptly turned eastward, and the successful evacuation of 600,000 residents spared countless lives. Only two deaths were recorded and overall damage was light, though half of all homes on St. Martin's Island were damaged.

Economy

Note: For the year 1992 average official exchange rate for BDT was 38.95 per US$.

Events

 26 March – The Ghatak-Dalal Nirmul Committee set up mock trials known as Gono Adalat (People's Court) led by Jahanara Imam in Dhaka and 'sentenced' persons they accused of being war criminals.
 10 April – The Logang massacre took place in Logang village in the Khagrachari District along the border with India. The massacre allegedly involved Bengali civilians, border guards, and the army who attacked the Jumma people with axes, hatchets, and guns, burning down all the houses. The government investigation committee announced that only 12 people have died, while the unofficial estimate puts the death-toll to around 400.
 21 October – The Bangladesh Open University was established with its main campus in Board Bazar, Gazipur District, Dhaka Division.
 7 December – There were a series of violence against the Bengali Hindus in protest against the demolition of Babri Masjid and violence against Muslims in India. the Dhakeshwari temple was attacked. The Bholanath Giri Ashram in Dhaka was attacked and looted. Hindu owned jewellery shops were looted in old Dhaka. Hindu houses in Rayerbazar were set on fire.
 8 December – Hindus were attacked in Kutubdia Upazila in Cox's Bazar District. Muslims attacked 14 Hindu temples, eight of them were burnt and six damaged. 51 Hindu houses in Ali Akbar Dale and another 30 in Choufaldandi.
 A third of the 250,000 Rohingyas of Burma flee into Bangladesh.

Awards and recognitions

International Recognition
 Gonoshasthaya Kendra / Zafrullah Chowdhury was awarded the Right Livelihood Award.

Independence Day Award

Ekushey Padak
 Dewan Mohammad Azraf (literature)
 Mobashwer Ali (literature)
 Emajuddin Ahamed (education)
 Khan Mohammad Salek (education)
 Gias Kamal Chowdhury (journalism)
 Ataus Samad (journalism)
 Shahnaz Rahmatullah (music)
 Amjad Hossain (drama)
 Hashem Khan (fine arts)

Sports
Olympics:
 Bangladesh sent a delegation to compete in the 1992 Summer Olympics in Barcelona, Spain. Bangladesh did not win any medals in the competition.
 Domestic football:
 Abahani KC won Dhaka League title while Mohammedan SC came out runner-up.
Cricket:
 The 1992–93 SAARC Quadrangular cricket Tournament started in Dhaka, Bangladesh in December 1992 amidst great enthusiasm and excitement.  4 teams, the 'A' teams from neighbouring India, Pakistan and Sri Lanka, and the full national team of the host country participated in the event. Due to the volatile political situation arising in the sub-continent, the tournament had to be abandoned at the League stage. Thus, there was no winners of the tournament.

Births
 7 February – Taijul Islam, cricketer
 5 August – Abul Hasan, cricketer
 24 October – Pori Moni, actor
 17 December – Asif Ahmed, cricketer
 16 December – Anamul Haque, cricketer

Deaths
 29 April – Ghulam Faruque Khan, Governor of East Pakistan (b. 1899)

See also 
 1990s in Bangladesh
 List of Bangladeshi films of 1992
 Timeline of Bangladeshi history

References